Room 8 Studio is an international art production and game development outsourcing company providing external services worldwide. Studio works with global publishers, including Activision, Nintendo, Ubisoft, Gameloft, EA, Xbox Game Studios, and many others. Room 8 covers a wide range of hi-end solutions, from free-to-play mobile gaming and game consoles porting to AAA game art, television, and film animation.

Company history

2011 

 Room 8 Studio was founded as a product company in Kyiv, Ukraine

2013 

 Delivered first own titles
 Cyto's Puzzle Adventure – studio’s first own game published by Chillingo and featured in Best New Games on the App Store in 68 countries
 Cyto selected by Starbucks and Apple for worldwide in-store promotion
 Shifted to co-development

2014 

 First co-development titles delivered with DeNA and G5
 Created art for Cookie Jam by Jam City, Facebook’s 2014 Game of the Year, and World of Tanks for Xbox
 Piano City published – #1 music game in 126 countries
 G5 published Mahjong Journey, which later became one of the App Store’s top 100 grossing games

2016 

 Started video production
 First porting projects
 Established long-term relationships with AAA game publishers
 Started to work with licensed IPs: Family Guy, Power Rangers, Kubo, Independence Day

2018 

 Room 8 Group established
 Added VFX service line
 Certified by major consoles: PlayStation, Xbox, Nintendo Switch
 Established partnerships with the best local and international art schools
 Dragon’s Lake Ent., a PC/Console co-development studio founded

2020 

 Room 8 Studio collaborated and released 3 full mobile game products. Contributed to Call of Duty: Cold War, Microsoft Flight Simulator, Fall Guys and more.
 Dragon’s Lake Ent. Port of Indivisible for 505 Games, co-development of an unreleased AAA 3rd person shooter, co-development for a semi-open world AAA game (under NDA).
 Full projects released and more AAA titles coming
 Added Art Direction & Visual Development as a service

2021 

 Contributed to Deathloop, Returnal, Age of Empires IV, Halo Infinite and more
 Opening offices worldwide
 Creative center in Canada
 Creative center in the UK
 Expansion in Japan

Studio structure

Art division 

 AAA game art production (Concept art, 3D characters, 3D environment, Animation and VFX, Game trailers, Art direction, Level building, In-engine integration)
 End-to-end art support
 Game trailers & UA videos

Games division 

 Full game development
 Game porting
 Game co-development (Game Economy Design, Engineering, Level Design)

Selected games developed by Room 8 Studio

Game Awards
2012 Cyto's Puzzle Adventure, Best Future Mobile Game
2013 Riot Runners, "#1 Upcoming Game Of The Year" by SlideDB 
2013 Riot Runners, Best game in show - Audience Award at Casual Connect Kyiv 2013
2014 Piano City, “One of the stand-out games of the Very Big Indie Pitch 2014” by Pocket Gamer.

References

External links
 

Ukrainian companies established in 2011
Video game companies established in 2011
Video game companies of Ukraine
Video game development companies